The 2013–14 VMI Keydets basketball team represented the Virginia Military Institute in the 2013–14 NCAA Division I men's basketball season. The Keydets were coached by Duggar Baucom, in his 9th year. They played their home games at 5,800 seat Cameron Hall as a member of the North Division of the Big South Conference. They finished the season 23–13, 11–5 in Big South play to finish in second place in the North Division. They advanced to the semifinals of the Big South Conference tournament where they lost to Coastal Carolina. They were invited to the CollegeInsider.com Tournament where they defeated Canisius, IPFW, and Ohio to advanced to the semifinals where they lost to Yale.

This season was VMI's last in the Big South Conference, where the Keydets have been since 2003, as they return to the Southern Conference starting in the 2014–15 academic year.

Recruiting

Roster

Depth chart

Schedule

|-
!colspan=9 style="background:#FF0000; color:#FFFF00;"| Regular season

|-
!colspan=9 style="background:#FF0000; color:#FFFF00;"| Big South tournament

|-
!colspan=9 style="background:#FF0000; color:#FFFF00;"| CIT

References

VMI Keydets basketball seasons
VMI
VMI
VMI Keydets bask
VMI Keydets bask